This is a list of compositions by Christoph Willibald Gluck.

Wq. Number by Alfred Wotquenne (1867-1939).

Opera 

 Wq.1 – Artaserse (1741)
 Wq.2 – Demetrio – or Cleonice (1742) 
 Wq.3 – Demofoonte (1743)
 Wq.4 – Artemene (1743), 1st Version
         – Il Tigrane (1743)
 Wq.5 – La Sofonisba – Siface (1744)
 Wq.6 – La finta schiava (1744)
 Wq.7 – Ipermestra (1744)
 Wq.8 – Poro (1744)
 Wq.9 – Ippolito – Fedra (1745)
 Wq.10 – La caduta de' giganti (1746)
 Wq.11 – Artemene (1746), 2nd Version
 Wq.12 – Le nozze d'Ercole e d'Ebe (1747)
 Wq.13 – La Semiramide riconosciuta (1748)
 Wq.14 – La contesa dei numi (1749)
 Wq.15 – Ezio (1749), 1st Version; Revised in 1763
 Wq.16 – La clemenza di Tito (1752)
 Wq.17 – Issipile (1751-1752)
 Wq.18 – Le cinesi (1754)
 Wq.19 – La danza (1755)
 Wq.20 – L'innocenza giustificata (1755), Revised as La vestale (1768)
 Wq.55 – Les amours champêtres (1755)
 Wq.21 – Antigono (1756)
 Wq.22 – Il re pastore (1756)
 Wq.23 – L'île de Merlin, ou Le monde renversé (1758)
 Wq.24 – La fausse esclave (1758)
 Wq.25 – L'arbre enchanté, ou Le tuteur dupé (1759), 1st Version
 Wq.26 – La Cythère assiégée (1759)
           – Le diable à quatre, ou La double métamorphose (1759)
 Wq.27 – Tetide (1760)
 Wq.28 – L’ivrogne corrigé (Der bekehrte Trunkenbold) (1760)
 Wq.29 – Le cadi dupé (Der betrogene Kadi) (1761)
           – Arianna (Pasticcio) (1762)
 Wq.30 – Orfeo ed Euridice (1762), Italian Version
 Wq.31 – Il trionfo di Clelia (1763)
           – Ezio (1763), 2nd Version
 Wq.32 – La rencontre imprévue – Les pèlerins de la Mecque (1764)
           – Enea e Ascanio (1764)
 Wq.33 – Il Parnaso confuso (1765)
 Wq.34 – Telemaco, ossia L’isola di Circe (1765)
 Wq.35 – La corona (1765)
 Wq.36 – Il prologo (1767)
 Wq.37 – Alceste, Italian Version of Alceste, Wq.44 (1767)
           – La vestale (1768), Revision of L’innocenza giustificata, Wq.20 (1755)
 Wq.38 – Le feste d'Apollo (1769)
 Prologue
 Bauci e Filemone
 Aristeo
 Orfeo (Early version of Orfeo ed Euridice)
           – Philémon et Baucis, Opéra-Ballet 
 Wq.39 – Paride ed Elena (1770)
           – Die unvermuthete Zusammenkunft (1772), German Version of La rencontre imprévue, Wq.32 (1764)
 Wq.40 – Iphigénie en Aulide (1774)
 Wq.41 – Orphée et Eurydice (1774), French Version of Orfeo ed Euridice, Wq.30 (1762)
 Wq.42 – L’arbre enchanté, ou Le tuteur dupé (1775), 2nd Version
 Wq.43 – La Cythère assiégée, Opéra-Ballet (1775), Revision of the 1759 Opera
 Wq.44 – Alceste (1776), French Version of Alceste, Wq.37 (1767)
 Wq.45 – Armide (1777)
 Wq.46 – Iphigénie en Tauride (1779), French Version
 Wq.47 – Echo et Narcisse (1779), 1st Version
           – Echo et Narcisse (1780), 2nd Version
           – Iphegenie auf Tauris (1781), German Version of Iphigénie en Tauride, Wq.46 (1779)

Ballet-Pantomime 
 Wq.51 – L’Orfano della china (1761), [doubtful work]
 Wq.52 – Don Juan, ou Le festin de Pierre (1761)
           – La Citera assediata (1762), Dance version of La Cythère assiégée, [music lost]
           – Alessandro (Les amours d’Alexandre et de Roxane) (c.1755)
 Wq.56 – Semiramis (1765)
           – Iphigénie (1765), [music lost]
           – Marche in G Major

Orchestral 
           – Sinfonia No.1 in F Major
           – Sinfonia No.2 in D Major
           – Sinfonia No.3 in D Major
           – Sinfonia No.4 in D Major
           – Sinfonia No.5 in D Major
           – Sinfonia No.6 in E Major
           – Sinfonia No.7 in F Major
           – Sinfonia No.8 in G Major
           – Sinfonia No.9 in F Major
About 18 Sinfonias total, some doubtful works
           – Flute Concerto, in G major, [doubtful work]
           – Violin Concerto, in G major, arr of the flute concerto

Chamber 
 (Wq.53) – mis-attributed to Gluck - Six Trio Sonatas for 2 Violins and Basso continuo, publ. 1746
 in C Major
 in G Minor
 in A Major
 in B♭ Major
 in E♭ Major
 in F Major
 (Wq.54) – mis-attributed to Gluck - Trio Sonata in E Major for 2 Violins and Basso continuo
 GluckWV 5.2.1 - authenticated Trio Sonata in F Major for 2 Violins and Basso continuo

Sacred Vocal 
           – Miserere (1744-1745), [music lost]
           – 2 Motets (1779)
 Wq.59 – Almæ sedes, Motet for Solo and Orchestra (c.1785)
 Wq.59 – Voces cantate
 Wq.50 – De profundis, Motet for Chorus and Orchestra (1782)

Vocal 
 Wq.48 – Morceaux de chant détachés
 Oh Dei che dolce incanto, for Soprano and Orchestra
 Per tutto il timore, for Soprano and Orchestra
 Benché copra al sole il volto (1749), for Soprano and Orchestra
 Và, ti sarò fedele, for Soprano and Orchestra
 Pace, Amor, torniamo in pace, Cantate de Métastase
 Che legge spietata, for Soprano, Flute Solo and Orchestra
 Berenice, ove sei; Ombre che pallida, Scene and Aria for Soprano and Orchestra
 Ah pietà se di me senti, Duetto for Soprano, Alto and Orchestra
 Nò, che non ha la sorte; Si, vedrò quell'alma ingrata, Recitativo and Aria for Soprano and Orchestra
 Wq.49 – 7 Oden und Lieder (c.1773~1785, published 1786)
 Vaterlandlied
 Wir und Sie
 Schlachtgesang
 Der Jüngling (2nd version)
 Die Sommernacht
 Die frühen Gräber
 Die Neigung
 Wq.57 – Der Jüngling, 1st version (1775), [doubtful work]
 Wq.60 – Amour en ces lieux for Voice, 2 Violins and Bass (c.1780)
 Wq.61 – Quand la beauté lance for Voice, 2 Violins and Bass (c.1780)
 Wq.58 – Ode an den Tod (c.1783, Published 1792)
 Wq.62 – Die Sommernacht, 2nd version (1785)
 Wq.63 – Minona lieblich und hold haucht reine Liebe, Duet (Published 1795)
           – Siegsgesang für Freie (Published 1795)
           – I lamenti d’amore, Cantata arranged from Alceste, Act III
           – Blütenmai herbei!
           – Einem Bach der fließt
           – In einem kühlen Grunde

Works without Wq number 
 Hoch tut euch auf

References

Gluck, Christoph Willibald